Rio Noble Ruiz (born May 22, 1994) is an American professional baseball third baseman for the Diablos Rojos del México of the Mexican League. He was selected in the fourth round of the 2012 Major League Baseball draft by the Houston Astros. Shortly before the start of the 2015 Major League Baseball season, Ruiz was traded to the Atlanta Braves. He has played in Major League Baseball (MLB) for the Braves, with whom he made his major league debut with during the 2016 season, the Baltimore Orioles, and Colorado Rockies.

Career

Amateur career
Ruiz attended Bishop Amat Memorial High School in La Puente, California. He played both baseball and football. Ruiz verbally committed to attend the University of Southern California (USC) as a 14-year-old freshman to play college baseball for the USC Trojans baseball team. As a junior, he was named The San Gabriel Valley Tribunes Baseball Player of the Year. Considered a potential first round pick in the 2012 Major League Baseball Draft entering his senior season, he missed most of the year due to a blood clot in his right clavicle.

Houston Astros
The Houston Astros selected Ruiz in the fourth round of the 2012 Major League Baseball draft. He signed with the Astros for $1.85 million over playing college baseball at USC. He made his professional debut that season for the Gulf Coast Astros and also played for the Greeneville Astros of the Rookie-level Appalachian League. He finished his first season hitting  and one home run in 38 games.

In 2013, Ruiz played for the Quad Cities River Bandits of the Class A Midwest League. He played in 114 games and hit .260/.335/.430 with 12 home runs. Ruiz spent the 2014 season with the Lancaster JetHawks of the Class A-Advanced California League. After the regular season, the Astros assigned Ruiz to the Salt River Rafters of the Arizona Fall League.

Atlanta Braves

The Astros traded Ruiz, Andrew Thurman, and Mike Foltynewicz to the Atlanta Braves in exchange for Evan Gattis and James Hoyt on January 14, 2015. He was assigned to the Mississippi Braves of the Class AA Southern League, where he struggled. Despite inconsistent results in Ruiz's first year with the Braves organization, he was invited to spring training in 2016 and began the season with the Gwinnett Braves of the Class AAA International League. He hit for a .271 batting average and a .755 on-base plus slugging percentage at the Triple A level, to go along with ten home runs and 62 runs batted in.

The Braves promoted Ruiz to the major leagues on September 17, 2016. The next day, he was announced as a pinch hitter in the seventh inning of a game against the Washington Nationals, but was unable to make a plate appearance before the contest was called due to rain. Ruiz tripled for his first major league hit on September 28, against Philadelphia Phillies pitcher Frank Herrmann.

Before reporting to spring training in 2017, Ruiz sought help from Azusa Pacific University track coach Kevin Reid, who aided Ruiz in improving his agility and conditioning. Ruiz began the 2017 season with Gwinnett and was promoted to the major leagues on May 18. On May 20, 2017, Ruiz hit his first major league home run off Washington Nationals pitcher Max Scherzer. Ruiz started the 2018 season at Gwinnett.

Baltimore Orioles
The Baltimore Orioles claimed Ruiz off waivers on December 10, 2018. On August 11, 2019, Ruiz hit his first career walk-off home run off Roberto Osuna of the Houston Astros. He finished the 2019 season with a .232 average, 12 home runs and 46 RBIs in 370 at bats.

In 2020 for the Orioles, Ruiz slashed .222/.286/.427 with 9 home runs and 32 RBI. After hitting .167 in 101 plate appearances in 2021, Ruiz was designated for assignment on May 18, 2021.

Colorado Rockies
On May 24, 2021, Ruiz was claimed off waivers by the Colorado Rockies. The Rockies assigned him to the Albuquerque Isotopes. Ruiz made his debut for Colorado on July 27, 2021. Ruiz played in 30 games for the Rockies, hitting .168 with 3 home runs and 10 RBI's. On October 21, Ruiz elected free agency.

LG Twins
On December 27, 2021, Ruiz signed with the LG Twins of the KBO League. He was waived on May 30, 2022, after struggling to a .155/.234/.262 line with 1 home run and 6 RBIs over 27 games.

Diablos Rojos del México
On July 13, 2022, Ruiz signed with the Diablos Rojos del México of the Mexican League.

Personal life
Ruiz and his wife Michelle have one son together who was born in 2019.

References

External links

1994 births
Living people
People from Covina, California
Baseball players from California
Major League Baseball third basemen
American baseball players of Mexican descent
American expatriate baseball players in South Korea
Atlanta Braves players
Baltimore Orioles players
Colorado Rockies players
Gulf Coast Astros players
Greeneville Astros players
Quad Cities River Bandits players
Lancaster JetHawks players
Salt River Rafters players
Mississippi Braves players
Gwinnett Braves players
Gwinnett Stripers players
Albuquerque Isotopes players
LG Twins players